Soy Loco por Ti America is an album by the Brazilian musician Gilberto Gil. It was released internationally in 1988.

Production
The title track was written in the 1960s by Gil and José Carlos Capinam; a cover version first appeared on Caetano Veloso's Caetano Veloso. Gil sang in Portuguese, Spanish, French, and English.

Critical reception

Robert Christgau deemed the album an "effortlessly funky tour de force," writing that "Milton Nascimento and Caetano Veloso are aesthetes like, to be kind, Joni Mitchell; Gil is a pop adept like Stevie Wonder." The New York Times wrote that Gil "embraces American grooves from the sambas and Bahian rhythms of his native Brazil to Jamaican reggae, Haitian compas, Puerto Rican salsa and James Brown funk—lending all of them the jauntiness of his band, the earthy directness of his voice and his distinctive melodic lift."

The Washington Post considered Soy Loco por Ti America to be "as sensuous and as rhythmically enticing an example of Gil's 'Tropicalism' as you're likely to find." The Boston Globe praised the "raw sound, pointed lyrics and very sophisticated stylistic blends."

AllMusic called the album "an electric album with plenty of brass attacks," writing that "it is fully danceable yet melodically rich and lyrically expressive."

Track listing

References

Gilberto Gil albums
1987 albums